The ornate stipplethroat or ornate antwren (Epinecrophylla ornata) is a species of bird in the family Thamnophilidae. It is found in Bolivia, Brazil, Colombia, Ecuador, and Peru. Its natural habitats are subtropical or tropical moist lowland forests and subtropical or tropical swamps.

Taxonomy
The ornate stipplethroat was described by the English zoologist Philip Sclater in 1853 and given the binomial name Formicivora ornata. It was subsequently placed in the genus Myrmotherula. The present genus Epinecrophylla was erected in 2006.

Five subspecies are recognized:
E. o. ornata - (Sclater, PL, 1853): Found in Colombia
E. o. saturata - (Chapman, 1923): Found in Colombia, Ecuador and Peru
E. o. atrogularis - (Taczanowski, 1874): Found in Peru and Brazil
E. o. meridionalis - (Zimmer, JT, 1932):  Found in  Peru, Bolivia and Brazil
E. o. hoffmannsi - (Hellmayr, 1906):  Found in Brazil

Description
The male has a grey head, neck and underparts, a black throat, a blackish tail and wings (with white tipped wing coverts), and a rufous back and rump throughout most of the bird's range; southern subspecies in Peru have a grey or greyish-brown back and rump. The female is similar but has a black and white speckled throat and buff underparts. The song is a high-pitched series of whistles, descending and getting faster.

Distribution and habitat

Ecology
Members of the genus Epinecrophylla tend to be specialists in extracting insects and spiders from clusters of dead leaves using beak and feet, foraging in this way for more than 75% of the time. Another characteristic of the genus seems to be the dome-shaped nest with side or oblique entrance; three of the species have this characteristic, while the nesting behaviours of the other members of the genus are not known.

Conservation status
Although the total population has not been estimated, the population trend is thought to be steady in the absence of any indications to the contrary. The International Union for Conservation of Nature has assessed the conservation status of this bird as being of "least concern".

References

ornate stipplethroat
Birds of the Amazon Basin
Birds of the Bolivian Amazon
Birds of the Colombian Amazon
Birds of the Ecuadorian Amazon
Birds of the Peruvian Amazon
ornate stipplethroat
ornate stipplethroat
Taxonomy articles created by Polbot